HMS Venturer is the lead ship of the Type 31 frigate-class currently under construction for the Royal Navy and the seventh vessel named . 

In May 2021, the names of the five planned Type 31 ships were announced by the First Sea Lord. The names were selected to represent key themes that represent the future plans of the Royal Navy and Royal Marines. 
Venturer, named after the Second World War submarine , the only submarine ever to have, while underwater, destroyed an enemy submarine in underwater battle, symbolises technology and innovation.

As of 2021, planning envisages Venturer being launched in 2023 and entering service by the 2025.The entire class is to be in service by February 2030.

First steel was cut for the new ship on 23 September 2021 signalling the start of construction. The keel of the ship was ceremonially laid down in April 2022.

References

Proposed ships of the Royal Navy
Type 31 frigates